Syzygium forte, commonly known as flaky-barked satinash, white apple or brown satinash, is a tree in the family Myrtaceae native to New Guinea and northern Australia.

Description
The leaves are arranged in opposite pairs on the twigs and are mid green in colour, paler below. They are somewhat leathery and have revolute margins. Those of subspecies S. f. forte are usually orbicular to obovate, while those of subspecies S. f. potamophilum can be narrowly ovate, elliptic or lanceolate.

Flowering occurs between September and January. The much-branched inflorescence terminates the leafy twigs in subspecies S. f. forte, and are produced below the leaves or inside the crown in subspecies S. f. potamophilum. The white flowers form in dense clusters with multiple white stamens.

The fruits are a globular white berry up to  diameter, containing a single large seed.

Taxonomy
This species was first formally described as Eugenia fortis by the German born Australian botanist Ferdinand von Mueller in 1865 as part of his massive work Fragmenta Phytographiae Australiae. In 1983 the species was reclassified by Bernie Hyland in his paper A revision of Syzygium and allied genera (Myrtaceae) in Australia., which was published in the Australian Journal of Botany Supplementary Series.

Infraspecies
 there are two recognised subspecies, as follows:
Syzygium forte subsp. forte (F.Muell.) B.Hyland.
Syzygium forte subsp. potamophilum B.Hyland.

Etymology
The genus name Syzygium was coined by Joseph Gaertner in 1788, and is taken from the Greek word syzgos, meaning "jointed" and is a reference to the paired leaves displayed by members of the genus. The species epithet forte is from the Latin fortis meaning 'strong'.

Distribution and habitat
Syzygium forte is native to New Guinea and the northern parts of Western Australia, the Northern Territory and Queensland in Australia. The subspecies S.f. potamophilum is found in all three states, and is the only species found in Western Australia. It is thought to be endemic to Australia. The other, S.f. forte, is found in the Northern Territory, Queensland and New Guinea.

It prefers sandy soils and is both cyclone resistant and salt tolerant.

Ecology
The fruit are eaten by cassowaries and fruit bats. The flowers attract many species of birds and insects.

Cultivation and uses
Indigenous Australians ate the fruit and used the leaves as a fish poison.

This species is too large for most private gardens but is useful as a park and street tree. The Cairns Regional Council has planted well over 400 of both subspecies combined throughout the city and suburbs. 

The tree sometimes produces timber worth milling, with a density of approximately 0.69 to 0.96 kg/L.

Gallery

References

External links
 
 
 View a map of historical sightings of this species at the Australasian Virtual Herbarium
 View observations of this species on iNaturalist
 View images of this species on Flickriver

Myrtales of Australia
Trees of Australia
Flora of Western Australia
Plants described in 1983
forte
Taxa named by Ferdinand von Mueller